The Europe Zone was the unique zone within Group 3 of the regional Davis Cup competition in 2018. The zone's competition was held in round robin format in two different locations, Plovdiv, Bulgaria and Ulcinj, Montenegro, from 3 to 7 April 2018. The two winning nations won promotion to Group II, Europe/Africa Zone, for 2019.

Participating nations

Inactive nation

Draw
Date: 3–7 April

Location 1: Tennis Club Lokomotiv, Plovdiv, Bulgaria (clay)  Location 2: Ulcinj Bellevue, Ulcinj, Montenegro (clay)

Format: Round-robin basis. Two pools of four teams at each venue. The winners of each pool play-off against each other to determine which nation will be promoted to Europe/Africa Zone Group II in 2019. Two promoted – one from each venue.

Seeding

 1Davis Cup Rankings as of 5 February 2018

Draw

Pool A (Plovdiv)

Pool B (Plovdiv)

Pool A (Ulcinj)

Pool B (Ulcinj) 

Standings are determined by: 1. number of wins; 2. number of matches; 3. in two-team ties, head-to-head records; 4. in three-team ties, (a) percentage of sets won (head-to-head records if two teams remain tied), then (b) percentage of games won (head-to-head records if two teams remain tied), then (c) Davis Cup rankings.

Playoffs 

 and  promoted to Group II in 2019.

Round Robin

Pool A (Plovdiv)

Bulgaria vs. Albania

Macedonia vs. Iceland

Bulgaria vs. Iceland

Macedonia vs. Albania

Bulgaria vs. Macedonia

Iceland vs. Albania

Pool B (Plovdiv)

Monaco vs. San Marino

Cyprus vs. Andorra

Monaco vs. Andorra

Cyprus vs. San Marino

Monaco vs. Cyprus

Andorra vs. San Marino

Pool A (Ulcinj)

Latvia vs. Greece

Montenegro vs. Armenia

Latvia vs. Montenegro

Greece vs. Armenia

Latvia vs. Armenia

Montenegro vs. Greece

Pool B (Ulcinj)

Moldova vs. Liechtenstein

Malta vs. Kosovo

Moldova vs. Malta

Liechtenstein vs. Kosovo

Moldova vs. Kosovo

Malta vs. Liechtenstein

Play-offs

Promotional play-offs

Bulgaria vs. Monaco

Montenegro vs. Malta

3rd to 4th play-offs

Macedonia vs. Cyprus

Greece vs. Moldova

5th to 6th play-offs

Iceland v Andorra

Latvia vs. Liechtenstein

7th to 8th play-offs

Albania vs. San Marino

Armenia vs. Kosovo

References

External links
Official Website

Europe Zone Group III
Davis Cup Europe/Africa Zone